Sabine Timoteo (born 25 March 1975) is a Swiss actress from the Lorraine district of  Bern. She has appeared in more than thirty films since 2000.

Early life 
Timoteo grew up dividing time between the United States and Lausanne, Switzerland. As a trained ballet dancer, she won the Prix de Lausanne at 17 years of age.

Career 
Prior to acting, Timoteo was an award-winning dancer. She gave up dancing after it began to negatively affect her body.

She spent three months in the Japanese Zen monastery Antaiji for the film Zen for Nothing.

Selected filmography

References

External links 

1975 births
Living people
Swiss film actresses
People from Bern
21st-century Swiss actresses
Lielais Kristaps Award winners